This is a timeline documenting the events of heavy metal in the year 1992.

Events 

Alice in Chains release their widely popular concept album, Dirt.
 Motörhead's drummer Phil Taylor finally leaves after recording "Ain't No Nice Guy" for the March or Die album. The drummer on that album is Tommy Aldridge, who was replaced by Mikkey Dee after recording the album.
Metallica frontman James Hetfield suffers second and third-degree burns due to a pyrotechnic accident during the Guns N' Roses/Metallica Stadium Tour.
 Living Colour's bassist Muzz Skillings leaves and is replaced by Doug Wimbish.
 On April, 20, The Freddie Mercury Tribute Concert is held. Top heavy metal/hard rock acts such as Guns N' Roses, Def Leppard, Metallica, Extreme and the heavy metal parody band Spinal Tap perform, as well as heavy metal/hard rock legends such as Robert Plant (Led Zeppelin), Roger Daltrey (The Who), and Tony Iommi (Black Sabbath).
 Body Count sparks nationwide controversy over the song from their self-titled debut album, "Cop Killer".
 Vince Neil leaves Mötley Crüe and is replaced by John Corabi
 Slayer drummer Dave Lombardo is replaced by Paul Bostaph.
 Fantoft Stave Church near Bergen, Norway is destroyed by Varg Vikernes of Burzum on June 6. Other church burnings attributed to black metal musicians also took place throughout Scandinavia.

Newly formed bands

Aborym
Alarum
Altar
Am I Blood
Ancient  
The Atomic Bitchwax
Beseech  
Beyond Twilight  
Black Messiah
Blockheads
Bloodlet
Bloodthorn
Boris 
Cage
Candiria 
Callenish Circle
Carpathian Forest
Cavity
Cephalic Carnage
Charon 
 Cruachan
Cubanate
Darkseed 
Deinonychus
Dew-Scented
Dies Irae
Disciple
Discordance Axis 
Disgorge 
 Edguy
Embodyment
 Esoteric
 Evoken
Fight 
Fimbulwinter
 Freak Kitchen
Freak of Nature
Gates of Ishtar
Godgory
 Gorgoroth
Gotthard 
Grand Belial's Key
 Graveworm
Harvey Milk
Helheim 
Hey
In the Woods...
Infernum
Jimmie's Chicken Shack
Judas Iscariot
Jungle Rot
 Legion of the Damned (as Occult)
Lethargy
Lord Belial
 Lordi
Malignancy
Meathook Seed
Memento Mori
Memory Garden
Moonspell
Morifade
Mystic Circle
Mysticum
Naglfar 
Nasum
 Necrophagist
Nefilim
Nidingr
Obtest
On Thorns I Lay
 P.O.D.
Quo Vadis 
 Rudra
Sacramentum 
Saratoga
Sirrah 
Skinless
Sons of Otis
Souls at Zero
Sponge
 Stone Sour
The 3rd and the Mortal
The Chasm 
 Tito & Tarantula
Today Is the Day
Trelldom
Tristitia
Troll
Ultimatum
Urgehal
 Vince Neil
Vision of Disorder
 Wolfgang

Reformed bands
 Mercyful Fate

Albums

 24-7 Spyz – Strength in Numbers
 AC/DC – AC/DC Live (live)
 Alice in Chains – Dirt
 Alice in Chains – Sap (EP)
 Amorphis - The Karelian Isthmus
 Anathema - The Crestfallen (EP)
 Anthem – Domestic Booty
 Anvil – Worth the Weight 
 Asphyx - Crush the Cenotaph (EP)
 At the Gates – The Red in the Sky Is Ours
 Atrocity - Todessehnsucht
 Autopsy – Acts of the Unspeakable
 Babylon A.D. – Nothing Sacred
 Bad4Good – Refugee
 Bangalore Choir – On Target
 Bang Tango – Aint No Jive Live
 Benediction - Dark is the Season (EP)
 Biohazard – Urban Discipline
 Black Sabbath – Dehumanizer
 Blind Guardian – Somewhere Far Beyond
 Body Count – Body Count
 Bolt Thrower – The IVth Crusade
 Bon Jovi – Keep the Faith
 Brain Dead – From the Ecstasy
 Brutal Truth - Extreme Conditions Demand Extreme Responses
 Burzum – Burzum
 Candlemass – Chapter VI
 Cannibal Corpse – Tomb of the Mutilated
 Carcass - Tools of the Trade (EP)
 Cathedral -Soul Sacrifice (EP)
 Celtic Frost – Parched with Thirst Am I and Dying (comp)
 Comecon - Megatrends in Brutality
 Cro-Mags – Alpha Omega
 Damn Yankees – Don't Tread
 Darkthrone – A Blaze in the Northern Sky
 Danzig – Danzig III: How the Gods Kill
 Def Leppard – Adrenalize
 Deicide – Legion
 Deliverance – Stay of Execution
 Demolition Hammer – Epidemic of Violence
 Dirty Looks – Five Easy Pieces
 Dismember - Pieces (EP)
 Dream Theater – Images and Words
 Drive – Diablero
 Earthshaker – Earthshaker
 Edge of Sanity - Unorthodox
 Edwin Dare – Unthinkable Deed 
 Electric Boys – Groovus Maximus
 Elegy – Labyrinth Of Dreams
 Exhorder – The Law
 Exodus – Force of Habit
 Extreme – III Sides to Every Story
 Faith No More – Angel Dust
 Faster Pussycat – Belted, Buckled and Booted
 Faster Pussycat – Whipped!
 Fear Factory – Soul of a New Machine
 FireHouse – Hold Your Fire
 FM - Aphrodisiac 
 The Gathering - Always...
 Godflesh – Pure
 Gorefest – False
 Maestro Alex Gregory – Paganini's Last Stand
 Grave - You'll Never See...
 Gun – Gallus
 Gwar – America Must Be Destroyed 
 Hardline – Double Eclipse
 Heavens Gate – Hell for Sale!
 Heavens Gate – More Hysteria (EP)
 Helmet – Meantime
 Darren Housholder – Darren Housholder
 Hypocrisy – Penetralia
 Incantation - Onward to Golgotha
 Immortal – Diabolical Fullmoon Mysticism
 Impetigo - Horror of the Zombies
 Iron Maiden – Fear of the Dark
 Kik Tracee – Field Trip
 Killers – Murder One
 King's X – King's X
 Kiss – Revenge
 Krabathor - Only Our Death Is Welcome...
 Kreator – Renewal
 Kyuss – Blues for the Red Sun
 Lacrimosa – Einsamkeit
 L.A. Guns – Cuts
 Lawnmower Deth - The Return of the Fabulous Metal Bozo Clowns
 Life Sex & Death – The Silent Majority
 Little Caesar – Influence
 Loudness – Loudness
 Love/Hate – Wasted In America
 Lynch Mob – Lynch Mob
 Tony MacAlpine – Freedom to Fly
 Malevolent Creation – Retribution
 Yngwie Malmsteen – Fire and Ice
 Manowar – The Triumph of Steel
 Massacre - Inhuman Condition (EP)
 Marduk - Dark Endless 
 Megadeth – Countdown to Extinction
 Mekong Delta - Kaleidoscope
 Mercyful Fate - Return of the Vampire
 Ministry – Psalm 69: The Way to Succeed and the Way to Suck Eggs
 M.O.D. - Rhythm of Fear
 Monster Magnet – Tab (EP)
 Monstrosity – Imperial Doom
 Mordred - Vision (EP)
 Mortification - Scrolls of the Megilloth
 Motörhead – March ör Die
 My Dying Bride – As the Flower Withers
 My Dying Bride – Symphonaire Infernus et Spera Empyrium (EP)
 Napalm Death – Utopia Banished
 Necrophagist – Requiems of Festered Gore (demo)
 Nembrionic - Themes on an Occult Theory (EP)
 Neurosis – Souls at Zero
 Nine Inch Nails – Broken (EP)
 Nine Inch Nails – Fixed (EP)
 Nocturnus – Thresholds
 Non-Fiction – In the Know
 Nuclear Assualt - Live at the Hammersmith Odeon
 Obituary – The End Complete
 Oomph! – Oomph!
 Pantera – Vulgar Display of Power
 Pan.Thy.Monium - Dawn of Dreams
 Paradise Lost – Shades of God
 Pitchshifter – Submit (EP)
 Pretty Maids - Sin-Decade
 Pro-Pain – Foul Taste of Freedom
 Prong - Whose Fist Is This Anyway (EP)
 Psychotic Waltz – Into the Everflow
 Racer X – Extreme Volume II Live (live)
 Rage – Trapped!
 Rage Against the Machine – Rage Against the Machine
 Re-Animator - That Was Then...This Is Now
 Reverend – Live (live EP)
 Riot - Live in Japan
 Rollins Band – The End of Silence

 Sadus – A Vision of Misery
 Saigon Kick – The Lizard
 Saint Vitus - C.O.D.
 Saints & Sinners – Saints & Sinners
 Samael - Blood Ritual
 Saxon – Forever Free
 The Screaming Jets – Tear of Thought
 Sinister - Cross The Styx
 Skid Row – B-Side Ourselves (EP)
 Skyclad - A Burnt Offering for the Bone Idol
 Slaughter – The Wild Life
 Sleeze Beez – Powertool
 Slik Toxik – Doin' the Nasty
 Sodom – Tapping the Vein
 Solitude Aeturnus – Beyond the Crimson Horizon
 Spinal Tap – Break Like the Wind
 Spread Eagle – Open To The Public
 Steelheart – Tangled in Reins
 Stone Temple Pilots – Core
 Izzy Stradlin – Izzy Stradlin and The Ju Ju Hounds
 Stratovarius – Twilight Time
 Suicidal Tendencies – Art of Rebellion
 T-Ride – T-Ride (album)
 Tankard – Stone Cold Sober
 Testament – The Ritual
 The Black Crowes – The Southern Harmony and Musical Companion
 Therapy? – Pleasure Death
 Therapy? – Nurse
 Therion - Beyond Sanctorum
 Tiamat – Clouds
 TNT – Realized Fantasies
 Tora Tora – Wild America
 Tourniquet – Pathogenic Ocular Dissonance
 Triumph – Edge of Excess
 Trixter – Hear!
 Trouble – Manic Frustration
 T.T. Quick – Thrown Together Live (live)
 Type O Negative - The Origin of the Feces
 Ugly Kid Joe – America's Least Wanted
 Unleashed – Shadows in the Deep
 Unruly Child – Unruly Child
 Vader – The Ultimate Incantation
 Vengeance Rising - Released Upon the Earth
 Viper – Evolution
 Viper Brazil – Vipera Sapiens (EP)
 Vital Remains – Let Us Pray
 Von – Satanic Blood
 Von Groove – Von Groove
 W.A.S.P. – The Crimson Idol
 Warrant – Dog Eat Dog
 Warrior Soul – Salutations from the Ghetto Nation
 White Zombie – La Sexorcisto: Devil Music Volume One
 Wildside – Under the Influence
 Xentrix - Kin

Disbandments
 Armored Saint (reformed in 1999)
 Atheist (reformed in 1993)
 Britny Fox (reformed in 2000)
 Europe (Hiatus until December 31, 1999, then full reformation with John Norum at guitar on October 2, 2003)
 Nightfall
 Nitro (reformed in 2016)
 Ratt (reformed in 1996)
 Stryper (reformed in 2003)
 White Lion (reformed in 1999)

References

1990s in heavy metal music
Metal